Paul Roekaerts (born 15 April 1939) is a Belgian middle-distance runner. He competed in the men's 800 metres at the 1964 Summer Olympics.

References

1939 births
Living people
Athletes (track and field) at the 1964 Summer Olympics
Belgian male middle-distance runners
Olympic athletes of Belgium
Place of birth missing (living people)